HMS Defiance was a 64-gun third rate ship of the line of the Royal Navy, launched on 31 August 1772 at Woolwich.

Defiance was wrecked in 1780.

Notes

References

Lavery, Brian (2003) The Ship of the Line - Volume 1: The development of the battlefleet 1650-1850. Conway Maritime Press. .

Ships of the line of the Royal Navy
Intrepid-class ships of the line
1772 ships